Eupithecia dargei is a moth in the  family Geometridae. It is found in Cameroon.

References

Moths described in 1988
dargei
Moths of Africa